James Hayter may refer to:

James Hayter (actor) (1907–1983), British actor
James Hayter (footballer) (born 1979), English footballer
James Hayter (RAF officer) (1917–2006), New Zealand flying ace of the Second World War
James Hayter (rugby union) (born 1978), English former rugby union player